To the Bitter End is a 1975 West German-Austrian drama film directed by Gerd Oswald and starring Maurice Ronet, Suzy Kendall and Susanne Uhlen.

It was shot on location around Vienna.

Synopsis
A former film star now enjoying a dissolute lifestyle funded by his wealthy wife, is offered a chance for a comeback role in a production about to start shooting.

Cast
 Maurice Ronet as Paul Jordan
 Suzy Kendall as Joan Jordan
 Susanne Uhlen as Shirley Jordan
 Christine Wodetzky as Natascha Petrowna
 Karl Renar as Mörtl
 Balduin Baas as Fogosch
 Rudolf Fernau as Schauberg
 Herbert Prikopa as Polzfuss
 Wolfgang Gasser as Schinzel
 Heinz Marecek as Chuc O'Donovan
 Regine Felden-Hatheyer as Anita Smetana
 Maria Guttenbrunner as Jeanette Remy
 Fritz Goblirsch as Kamera-Assistant
 Manfred Spies as Jerry
 Erich Padalewski as Lehrer
 Ferdy Mayne as Wallace

References

Bibliography
 Goble, Alan. The Complete Index to Literary Sources in Film. Walter de Gruyter, 1999.

External links 
 

1975 films
1975 drama films
German drama films
West German films
1970s German-language films
Films directed by Gerd Oswald
Films scored by Klaus Doldinger
Austrian drama films
Constantin Film films
Films shot in Vienna
Films set in Vienna
Films about filmmaking
1970s German films